Gyo-dong may refer to the following dong (neighbourhoods) in South Korea:

 Gyo-dong, Chuncheon
 Gyo-dong, Daegu
 Gyo-dong, Gangneung
 Gyo-dong, Gimcheon
 Gyo-dong, Gimje
 Gyo-dong, Gongju
 Gyo-dong, Gwonseon-gu
 Gyo-dong, Gyeongju
 Gyo-dong, Jecheon
 Gyo-dong, Jeonju
 Gyo-dong, Miryang
 Gyo-dong, Naju
 Gyo-dong, Paldal-gu
 Gyo-dong, Samcheok
 Gyo-dong, Sokcho
 Gyo-dong, Ulsan
 Gyo-dong, Yangsan
 Gyo-dong, Yeosu